Oak Point-Bartibog Bridge  is a local service district in New Brunswick, Canada. The name is sometimes spelled Bartibogue Bridge.

History

Two noted landmarks are the MacDonald Farm Provincial Historic Site, an 18th-century stone farmhouse built by Colonel Alexander MacDonald, an early pioneer in the Miramichi area. It is now a Provincial Historic Site. A second is St Peter and St Paul's Church at Moody's Point, one of the earliest churches in the area, serving Scotch Catholics of the surrounding districts.

Notable people

See also
List of communities in New Brunswick

References

Communities in Northumberland County, New Brunswick
Local service districts of Northumberland County, New Brunswick